Crisis communication is a sub-specialty of the public relations profession that is designed to protect and defend an individual, company, or organization facing a public challenge to its reputation. Crisis communication is aimed at raising awareness of a specific type of threat, the magnitude, outcomes, and specific behaviors to adopt to reduce the threat. The communication scholar Timothy Coombs defines crisis as "the perception of an unpredictable event that threatens important expectancies of stakeholders and can seriously impact an organization's performance and generate negative outcomes" and crisis communication as "the collection, processing, and dissemination of information required to address a crisis situation."

One key concept in crisis communication is the notion of "stealing thunder," which refers to proactively disclosing unfavorable information before it is revealed by external sources. This strategy allows organizations to take control of the narrative and appear more transparent, honest, and trustworthy. By preemptively disclosing negative information, organizations can also minimize the impact of the crisis and reduce the likelihood of rumors, speculation, or misinformation.

Meaning can be socially constructed; because of this, the way that the stakeholders of an organization perceive an event (positively, neutrally, or negatively) is a major contributing factor to whether the event will become a crisis. Additionally, it is important to separate a true crisis situation from an incident. The term crisis “should be reserved for serious events that require careful attention from management.”

Crisis management has been defined as "a set of factors designed to combat crises and to lessen the actual damages inflicted." Crisis management should not merely be reactionary; it should also consist of preventative measures and preparation in anticipation of potential crises. Effective crisis management has the potential to greatly reduce the amount of damage the organization receives as a result of the crisis, and may even prevent an incident from ever developing into a crisis.

Theories in crisis communication research 
In crisis communication literature, several streams of research exist at the same time. Different theories demonstrate certain ways to look at and explain crisis situations.

Apologia Theory 
"It is, as one would assume, an effort to  defend and protect image. But it is not necessarily an apology."  This theory would be used by an organization to deny public discourse and address a crisis.

Image repair theory (IRT) 
William  Benoit established image repair theory (IRT) based on apologia studies. IRT assumes that image is an asset that a person or an organization attempts to protect during a crisis. When the person or the organization is attacked, the accused should draft messages to repair its image. Benoit further introduced 5 general and 14 specific response strategies the accused could harness during a crisis. General categories include deny, evading responsibility, reducing offensiveness, corrective action, and mortification.

Situational crisis communication theory (SCCT) 
Timothy Coombs started working on situational crisis communication theory (SCCT) in 1995. Originated from attribution theory, SCCT assumes that crises are negative events that stakeholders attempt to attribute responsibility. Coombs believes crisis managers can employ different crisis strategies according to different crisis types. Different from IRT, SCCT is an audience-oriented theory which focuses on stakeholders’ perceptions of crisis situations. This idea is in line with Benoit's argument that crisis management concerns perception more so than reality.

Social-mediated crisis communication (SMCC) model 
As social networks and blogs become popular, people spend more time online during crises. Social-mediated crisis communication (SMCC) model is introduced to investigate crisis management in online context. The model first explains how the source and form of information affect response selections and then proposes crisis response strategies. The model argues that five factors influence an organizations’ communication during a crisis: crisis origin, crisis type, infrastructure, message strategy, and message form.

Integrated crisis mapping (ICM) model 
Another line of crisis communication research focuses on stakeholders’ emotional changes in times of crises. Jin, Pang, and Cameron introduces integrated crisis mapping (ICM) model to understand stakeholders’ varied emotion during a crisis. ICM assumes that people keep interpreting their emotions during a crisis. Through Jin, Pang, and Cameron's analyzation of fourteen real-life crisis case studies, they found that "anxiety was the default emotion in most, if not all, crisis posited in the model." However, common dominant emotions expressed during a crisis also include anger, fright and sadness; these vary depending on the nature of the crisis.

Covariation-based approach to crisis communication 
As an extension of SCCT, Andreas Schwarz suggested to apply Kelley's covariation principle (attribution theory) more consistently in crisis communication to better explain the emergence and perception of causal attributions in crisis situations and deduce certain information strategies from this model and/or according findings. In this approach the three informational dimensions of consensus, distinctiveness, and consistency are conceptualized for situations of organizational crises (or other types of crisis) to predict the likelihood of stakeholders to make organizational attributions, entity attributions, or circumstance attributions and subsequently influence responsibility perceptions and evaluations of organizational reputation.

Discourse of renewal 
The discourse of renewal theory examines the components an organization can employ when navigating a crisis in order to mitigate significant issues within the organization when entering the post-crisis stage. It is a theory assessed by Gregory Ulmer, Timothy Sellnow, and Matthew Seeger as a framework that "emphasizes learning from the crisis, ethical communication, communication that is prospective in nature, and effective organizational rhetoric".

Rhetorical Arena Theory (RAT) 
Developed by Frandsen and Johansen (2010; 2017), RAT distinguishes itself from other crisis communication research due to its multi-vocal approach. RAT assumes that there are various voices which all communicate with one another inside a 'rhetorical arena' to co-construct the crisis dialogue. Therefore, RAT focuses on understanding the patterns of interaction between said various voices. For the purpose of their theory, the term 'rhetorical arena' is used to denote a space that opens during a crisis where different actors, including other corporations, political actors, activists, experts, and the media, talk to and about each other.

Categories of crisis management

Coombs identifies three phases of crisis management.

Pre-crisis: preparing ahead of time for crisis management in an effort to prevent a future crisis from occurring. This category is also sometimes called the prodromal crisis stage.
Crisis: the response to an actual crisis event.
Post-crisis: occurs after the crisis has been resolved; the efforts by the crisis management team to understand why the crisis occurred and to learn from the event.

Inside the management step, Bodeau-Ostermann identifies 6 successive phases:
- reaction, where the group behaves on first sight,
- extension, because the crisis dilutes itself and touches neighbours,
- means (material and human), which constitutes an overview of success/failures of emergency reaction,
- focus, stands as a concrete action or event on which the team leaders concentrate to fight crisis,
- retraction, is the moment where the group diminishes means involved, in accordance with its aims,
- rehabilitation, where, as a last step, result is, for the group, emergence of new values, stronger than the older.

Auer (2020), challenges the three phases approach to crisis communication, arguing that a crisis communicator can mistakenly assume that the post-crisis stage is underway, when in fact, there is merely a “lull” in the crisis. The risk is heightened for crises that are long-lasting or that have “waves” – like Covid-19.

Crisis response strategy 
Both situational crisis communication theory and image repair theory assume organizations should protect their reputation and image through appropriate responses to the crisis. Therefore, how to draft effective message to defend the crisis becomes the focal point of crisis communication research. Image repair theory provides series of options that organizations usually adopt including denial, evade responsibility, reduce offensiveness, corrective action, and mortification. Specifically, denial strategy contains two sub-strategies, simple denial and shift blame. Evade responsibility strategy includes provocation, defeasibility, accident, good intention. Reduce offensiveness strategy garners bolstering, minimization, differentiation, transcendence, attack accuser, and compensation.

SCCT also offers a handful of strategies: denial, scapegoat, attack the accuser, excuse, justification, ingratiation, concern, compassion, regret, apology. Coombs argues different strategy should be adopted according different situations.

The article "Crisis response and crisis timing strategies, two sides of the same coin" by Claeys and Cauberghe discusses crisis management strategies and the importance of timing in responding to crises.  Crisis response and crisis timing strategies are two sides of the same coin and should be considered together when developing crisis management plans.

Different crisis response strategies include denial, diminish, rebuild, and reinforce.  The importance of crisis timing strategies, such as pre-crisis preparation, crisis identification, crisis assessment, and crisis communication.  Timing is critical in crisis management, as delays or inappropriate responses can worsen the crisis.  The relationship between crisis response and crisis timing strategies, arguing that these two strategies should be integrated and not treated as separate entities. An effective crisis management plan should consider both strategies and use them in a coordinated and complementary way.  Practical recommendations for crisis managers.  creating a crisis management plan that integrates both response and timing strategies, conducting regular crisis simulations and rehearsals, and communicating with stakeholders throughout the crisis management process.

Crisis communication tactics

Pre-crisis 

 Researching and collecting information about crisis risks specific to the organization.
 Creating a crisis management plan that includes making decisions ahead of time about who will handle specific aspects of a crisis if and when it occurs. 
 Conducting exercises to test the plan at least annually.
 Preparing press release templates for the organization's public relations team in the event of a crisis.
 The chain of command that all employees will follow in the dissemination of information to all publics during a crisis situation. 
A rapid response crisis communications team should be organized during the pre-crisis stage  and all individuals who will help with the actual crisis communication response should be trained. At this stage the communication professional focuses on detecting and identifying possible risks that could result in a crisis.

In-crisis 

Crisis communication tactics during the crisis stage may include the following: the identification of the incident as a crisis by the organization's crisis management team; the collection and processing of pertinent information to the crisis management team for decision making; and also the dissemination of crisis messages to both internal and external publics of the organization.

Post-crisis 

 Reviewing and dissecting the successes and failures of the crisis management team in order to make any necessary changes to the organization, its employees, practices, or procedures.
 Providing follow-up crisis messages as necessary.
Timothy Coombs proposes that post-crisis communication should include the following five steps:
 Deliver all information promised to stakeholders as soon as that information is known.
 Keep stakeholders updated on the progression of recovery efforts including any corrective measures being taken and the progress of investigations.
 Analyze the crisis management effort for lessons and integrate those lessons in to the organization's crisis management system.
 Scan the Internet channels for online memorials.
 Consult with victims and their families to determine the organization's role in any anniversary events or memorials.
In general, Timothy Coombs raises some practices regarding to crisis response strategy based on SCCT that crisis managers should consider carefully.
 All victims or potential victims should receive instructing information, including recall information. This is one-half of the base response to a crisis.
 All victims should be provided an expression of sympathy, any information about corrective actions and trauma counseling when needed. This can be called the “care response.” This is the second half of the base response to a crisis.
 For crises with minimal attributions of crisis responsibility and no intensifying factors, instructing information and care response is sufficient.
 For crises with minimal attributions of crisis responsibility and an intensifying factor, add excuse and/or justification strategies to the instructing information and care response.
 For crises with low attributions of crisis responsibility and no intensifying factors, add excuse and/or justification strategies to the instructing information and care response.
 For crises with low attributions of crisis responsibility and an intensifying factor, add compensation and/or apology strategies to the instructing information and care response.
 For crises with strong attributions of crisis responsibility, add compensation and/or apology strategies to the instructing information and care response.
 The compensation strategy is used anytime victims suffer serious harm.
 The reminder and ingratiation strategies can be used to supplement any response.
 Denial and attack the accuser strategies are best used only for rumor and challenge crises.

Benoit's 5 Major Strategies

Denial 
There are two forms of denial: Simple denial which involves denying the involvement or the act, and shifting the blame, which is also known as Scapegoating. Scapegoating in crisis communication refers to the tendency of organizations to blame an individual or group for a crisis in order to divert attention from their own responsibility and protect their reputation.  This is a quick fix strategy but often can create long-term negative consequences the organization itself and the individual or group taking the blame. Blaming other can result in a decline in organizational reputation, decreased trust, and reduced stakeholder confidence.

Evasion of Responsibility 
Evading responsibility involves the following 4 steps. 
 Provocation, suggesting that the accused only responded after being provoked. 
 Defeasibility, suggesting that lack of control or information is to blame. 
 Accidents, suggesting that it was an accident
 Good intentions, suggest that it was done with good intentions in mind, despite the negative outcome.

Reducing 
The apologists will attempt to reduce the offensiveness of the acts by: 
 Bolstering by describing positive attributes
 Minimizing to decrease the negative view of the situation
 Differentiation by comparing the act to other similar acts that ended in worse terms 
 Transcending by discussion in terms of abstract values and group loyalty.  
 Attacking the accuser in an attempt to eliminate credibility 
 Offering compensation to victims

Corrective Action 
The apologist will express corrective action when they attempt to correct the situation and prevent it from ever happening again.

Mortification 
When the apologist admits wrongful behavior and asks for forgiveness while apologizing.

Crisis communication dilemma 
An increasing number of studies are investigating "stealing thunder". The concept originates from law, which indicates that lawyers report flaws in their own cases instead of giving the opponent opportunities to find the flaw. Journal articles frequently demonstrates the advantage of adopting "stealing thunder" strategy in minimizing reputational loss during crises. They argue organizations should report the problems first. However, the strategy itself is fundamentally counter-intuitive. Companies are unwilling to disclose their crisis because there is a chance that the public will never know.

"Stealing thunder" in crisis communication and how perceived organizational transparency affects its effectiveness. Stealing thunder refers to the proactive release of negative information by an organization before it is released by external sources. The article "How to Maximize the Effectiveness of Stealing Thunder in Crisis Communication: The Moderating Role of Perceived Organizational Transparency" by Kim and Lee examines the concept of "stealing thunder" in crisis communication and how perceived organizational transparency affects its effectiveness.

The authors conducted two experimental studies to investigate the relationship between stealing thunder and perceived organizational transparency. The first study found that stealing thunder is more effective in enhancing an organization's reputation when the organization is perceived as transparent. The second study found that perceived organizational transparency moderated the relationship between stealing thunder and crisis response strategies, with stealing thunder being more effective when organizations are perceived as more transparent.

"Stealing Thunder" is a controversial topic. Research would suggest being proactive and disclosing negative information early on can help minimize repetitional damage, it is understandable that companies would still be hesitant to do so. The fear of negative publicity and  the potential impact of their business can make it difficult to disclose information that could harm their reputation.  Crisis communication is about managing the situation in the best way possible.  Business being proactive and disclosing negative information early on can demonstrate transparency and willingness to take responsibility for their actions. This builds truest and credibility with stakeholders, which is crucial in times of crisis.  Companies needs to analyze the risk and benefits of "stealing thunder" and decide the best course of actions for their organization. They may even consider seeking advice from crisis communication experts or conducting a risk assessment for an informative decision.

Effective crisis communication can help organizations maintain or enhance their reputation in the face of a crisis. Existing research shows with a focus on the interplay between reputation and crisis response strategies businesses can have effective crisis communication. Several key factors that can affect the effectiveness of crisis communication include the timing and type of response, the credibly of the source, and the nature of the crisis.  In the "Corporate Crisis Communication: Examining the Interplay of Reputation and Crisis Response Strategies" the article emphasizes the importance of managing corporate reputation during a crisis.  Effective crisis communication can help organization maintain and/or enhance their reputation in the face of a crisis. Organization should adopt a proactive approach to crisis communication, that involves being transparent and honest about the situation, acknowledging any mistakes or shortcomings, and taking responsibility for addressing the crisis.

According to the article effective crisis communication requires a well-crafted response strategy that is tailored to the specific crisis at hand.  It is suggested that organizations should consider factors such as the severity of the crisis, the stakeholders involved, and potential impact on the organization's reputation when developing their response strategy.  The article highlights the importance of timing in crisis communication, noting that a prompt and decisive response can mitigate repetitional damage.

Research has shown that proactive crisis communication can be effective in reducing the negative impact of a crisis on an organization's reputation. In particular, "stealing thunder" has been shown to be an effective strategy for minimizing reputational damage. There are several examples of organizations that have successfully used this strategy to manage crises, including Johnson & Johnson's response to the Tylenol poisonings and Toyota's response to its sudden-acceleration crisis. The decision to adopt a proactive crisis communication strategy can be difficult for organizations, as it involves acknowledging the crisis and potentially damaging information. However, the benefits of proactive communication, including the ability to control the narrative and minimize reputational damage, outweigh the risks. The author suggests that organizations should develop a crisis communication plan that includes a proactive communication strategy and that is tailored to the specific crisis at hand.

The use of proactive crisis communication and the use of "stealing thunder" can be an effective strategy for managing crisis and minimizing reputational damage.  Organizations should prioritize transparency in their crisis communication strategies and proactively release negative information to maintain their reputation.  Organizations should consider the timing and content of their "stealing thunder" strategy, as well as the level of transparency that stakeholders perceive.  The importance of perceived organizational transparency in the effectiveness of stealing thunder as a crisis communication strategy.  Organizations should prioritize transparency and consider the timing and content of their stealing thunder strategy to maintain their reputation during a crisis.

Landmark crisis communication case studies

The Tylenol-Tampering Crisis – 1982 & 1986
The Exxon-Valdez-Oil Spill Crisis — 1989
The Bridgestone/Firestone & Ford-Tire Crisis – 1990s
The McDonald's-Hot Coffee Crisis – 1992
The Pepsi-Syringe Crisis - 1993
The Dominos-YouTube Crisis - 2009
The BP-Gulf Oil Spill — 2010
The Love Parade stampede crisis in Duisburg (Germany) 2010
The Toronto Mayor Rob Ford scandals of 2013–2014. 
Malaysia Airlines' MH 370 disappearance
The 2017 United Express Flight 3411 incident
Most major companies during the COVID-19 pandemic.

Notes

References and external links

 Schwarz, A., Seeger, M., & Auer, C. (eds.) (2016). The handbook of international crisis communication research. Chichester: Wiley Blackwell: 
 Crisis Management and Communication Entry Essential Knowledge Project from the Institute for Public Relations
 International Research Group on Crisis Communication Publications and crisis institutions database at Ilmenau University of Technology (English pages available)
 The 3 Most Effective Crisis Communication Strategies - Debra B. Davenport Purdue University Online Masters of Science in Communication degree program. 

Public relations terminology
Communication studies